School in the Mailbox is a 1947 Australian short documentary film directed by Stanley Hawes. It was nominated for an Academy Award for Best Documentary Short.

References

External links

, posted by the National Film and Sound Archive

1947 films
1947 documentary films
1947 short films
Australian short documentary films
Australian black-and-white films
1940s short documentary films
Black-and-white documentary films
Films directed by Stanley Hawes
Distance education in Australia
1940s English-language films
1940s Australian films